Maria Paulina "Marie Pauline" Åhman, née Landby (1812–1904), was a Swedish harpist. She is known as the first known female musician employed at the Royal Swedish Chapel orchestra Kungliga Hovkapellet.

She was a student of the harp player Edward Pratté 1830–35 and was given a position in the royal chapel in 1850 (permanently in 1856). While women had been employed in the royal chapel as vocalists since the employment of Sophia Schröder in 1727, Åhman is the first known woman to have been employed as an instrumentalist. She kept her position until 1881 and was described as very able and dutiful. She retired with a royal pension. She also held public concerts and was in 1870–75 and 1887–91 active as a teacher at the Royal College of Music, Stockholm, where she had several famous students.

See also 
 Anna Lang

References 
 Europas konstnärer (The artists of Europe)(1887) Arvid Ahnfelt (Swedish)
 Anna Ivarsdotter Johnsson och Leif Jonsson: "Musiken i Sverige. Frihetstiden och Gustaviansk tid 1720-1810" (Music in Sweden. The age of liberty and the Gustavian age 1720–1810)
 http://www.hovkapellet.com/sv/musiker/visa_musiker.do?musiker_id=954
 Nordisk familjebok / Uggleupplagan. 33. Väderlek - Äänekoski 
 Svenskt porträttgalleri / XXI. Tonkonstnärer och sceniska artister (biografier af Adolf Lindgren & Nils Personne)
 Idun Nr 17, 1892

Further reading
 

1812 births
1904 deaths
19th-century Swedish musicians
Swedish classical musicians
Swedish harpists
19th-century Swedish women musicians